Sor Juana Inés de la Cruz is a Mexican telenovela produced by Televisa and broadcast by Telesistema Mexicano in 1962. It is based on the life of Juana Inés de la Cruz.

Cast 
Amparo Rivelles – Juana Inés de la Cruz
Guillermo Murray – Fabio de los Sonetos
Julio Alemán
Augusto Benedico
Ariadna Welter
Anita Blanch
Andrea Palma
Jacqueline Andere
José Gavaéz
Manuel Calvo
Luis Bayardo
Fernando Mendoza
Armando Calvo
Emilia Carranza
Ada Carrasco
Malena Doria

References

External links 

Mexican telenovelas
1962 telenovelas
Televisa telenovelas
1962 Mexican television series debuts
1962 Mexican television series endings
Juana Inés de la Cruz
Spanish-language telenovelas